The German Castles Association or DBV is dedicated to the conservation of historic defensive and residential buildings as witnesses of history and culture and has its headquarters at Marksburg Castle above Braubach on the Rhine. It owns the organisation known as the European Castles Institute (Europäisches Burgeninstitut) or (EBI) whose library and archives are housed in Philippsburg Palace in Braubach.

Entries in the castles inventory database EBIDAT

See also 
 Schweizerischer Burgenverein
 Südtiroler Burgeninstitut

References

External links 
 Website of the DBV
 Burgen and Schlosser, Journal of the Deutsche Burgenvereinigung, archive
 Databank of the  European Castle Institute of the DBV
 Die Faszination der mittelalterlichen Burgen, interview on the work of the DBV with Alexander Fürst zu Sayn-Wittgenstein-Sayn at Monuments online

Non-profit organisations based in Rhineland-Palatinate
Castles in Germany